This is a list of 129 species in Xestocephalus, a genus of leafhoppers in the family Cicadellidae.

Xestocephalus species

 Xestocephalus abyssinicus Heller & Linnavuori 1968 c g
 Xestocephalus adiopodoumus Linnavuori 1979 c g
 Xestocephalus aethiopicus Melichar 1914 c g
 Xestocephalus agassizi Van Duzee 1912 c g
 Xestocephalus albidus Evans 1954 c g
 Xestocephalus albopunctatus Linnavuori 1959 c g
 Xestocephalus amenus DeLong, Wolda & Estribi 1980 c g
 Xestocephalus ancorifer Linnavuori 1959 c g
 Xestocephalus antimachus Linnavuori 1979 c g
 Xestocephalus antlerus DeLong, Wolda & Estribi 1980 c g
 Xestocephalus apicalis Melichar 1903 c g
 Xestocephalus aquilus DeLong, Wolda & Estribi 1983 c g
 Xestocephalus artarus DeLong, Wolda & Estribi 1980 c g
 Xestocephalus asper Linnavuori 1969 c g
 Xestocephalus australensis Kirkaldy 1907 c g
 Xestocephalus badius DeLong, Wolda & Estribi 1980 c g
 Xestocephalus balli Van Duzee 1907 c g
 Xestocephalus bicolor Matsumura 1914 c g
 Xestocephalus bicoloratus DeLong, Wolda & Estribi 1983 c g
 Xestocephalus bicornis Linnavuori 1969 c g
 Xestocephalus bifasciatus Cwikla & Wolda 1986 c g
 Xestocephalus bifidus DeLong & Linnavuori 1978 c g
 Xestocephalus binatus Cai & He c g
 Xestocephalus bipunctatus Van Duzee 1907 c g
 Xestocephalus botelensis Matsumura 1940 c g
 Xestocephalus brunneus Van Duzee, 1907 b  (brown xestocephalus)
 Xestocephalus bulbus Cwikla, 1985 c g b
 Xestocephalus canidia Linnavuori 1979 c g
 Xestocephalus cervinus DeLong, Wolda & Estribi 1980 c g
 Xestocephalus chibianus Matsumura 1940 c g
 Xestocephalus cinctus DeLong 1980 c g
 Xestocephalus cirus Evans 1955 c g
 Xestocephalus cognatus Choe 1981 c g
 Xestocephalus consentaneus Linnavuori 1979 c g
 Xestocephalus contortuplicatus Kirkaldy 1907 c g
 Xestocephalus coronatus Osborn & Ball 1897 c g
 Xestocephalus cristifer Logvinenko 1981 c g
 Xestocephalus culmus DeLong, Wolda & Estribi 1980 c g
 Xestocephalus curtus DeLong & Linnavuori 1978 c g
 Xestocephalus dedecus DeLong, Wolda & Estribi 1980 c g
 Xestocephalus delongi Cwikla 1985 c g
 Xestocephalus desertorum (Berg, 1879) c g b
 Xestocephalus dimonika Linnavuori 1969 c g
 Xestocephalus dissimilis Distant 1918 c g
 Xestocephalus dubius DeLong 1982 c g
 Xestocephalus eumaios Linnavuori 1973 c g
 Xestocephalus fasciatus Evans 1954 c g
 Xestocephalus feowerpacchus Cwikla 1985 c g
 Xestocephalus fistutlus Cwikla 1985 c g
 Xestocephalus fucatus Evans 1954 c g
 Xestocephalus fulvocapitatus  b
 Xestocephalus fulvus DeLong, Wolda & Estribi 1983 c g
 Xestocephalus fuscarus DeLong, Wolda & Estribi 1980 c g
 Xestocephalus fuscomaculatus Kamitani 2005 c g
 Xestocephalus fuscus Evans 1954 c g
 Xestocephalus guttulatus Motschulsky 1859 c g
 Xestocephalus igerna Linnavuori 1969 c g
 Xestocephalus iguchii Matsumura 1914 c g
 Xestocephalus immaculatus Linnavuori 1959 c g
 Xestocephalus irroratus Osborn 1924 c g
 Xestocephalus ishidae Matsumura 1914 c g
 Xestocephalus izzardi Metcalf 1955 c g
 Xestocephalus japonicus Ishihara 1961 c g
 Xestocephalus javanus Melichar 1914 c g
 Xestocephalus jucundus Linnavuori 1954 c g
 Xestocephalus koreanus Kwon 1981 c g
 Xestocephalus koshunensis Matsumura 1914 c g
 Xestocephalus kuyanianus Matsumura 1914 c g
 Xestocephalus longus Cwikla 1985 c g
 Xestocephalus lunatus Peters, 1933 c g b
 Xestocephalus luridus Linnavuori 1959 c g
 Xestocephalus maculatus Osborn 1929 c g
 Xestocephalus magnificus Evans 1966 c g
 Xestocephalus maquilingensis Merino 1936 c g
 Xestocephalus medius Linnavuori 1969 c g
 Xestocephalus mexicanus DeLong & Linnavuori 1978 c g
 Xestocephalus minimus China 1935 c g
 Xestocephalus miramari DeLong, Wolda & Estribi 1980 c g
 Xestocephalus montanus Matsumura 1914 c g
 Xestocephalus nigrifrons  b
 Xestocephalus nikkoensis Matsumura 1914 c g
 Xestocephalus nilgiriensis Distant 1918 c g
 Xestocephalus ornatus Van Duzee 1907 c g
 Xestocephalus osborni Merino 1936 c g
 Xestocephalus ovalis Evans 1966 c g
 Xestocephalus paganurus Melichar 1903 c g
 Xestocephalus pallescens Linnavuori 1979 c g
 Xestocephalus pallidiceps Kirkaldy 1907 c g
 Xestocephalus panamanus DeLong, Wolda & Estribi 1983 c g
 Xestocephalus piceatus Osborn 1934 c g
 Xestocephalus piceus  b
 Xestocephalus polleti Linnavuori 1979 c g
 Xestocephalus provancheri  b
 Xestocephalus pulicarius Van Duzee, 1894 g
 Xestocephalus pullus DeLong, Wolda & Estribi 1983 c g
 Xestocephalus punctatus Caldwell 1952 c g
 Xestocephalus purpurascens Kirkaldy 1907 c g
 Xestocephalus quadripunctatus Linnavuori 1955 c g
 Xestocephalus ramulus DeLong & Linnavuori 1978 c g
 Xestocephalus reflexus Osborn 1934 c g
 Xestocephalus relatus Distant 1918 c g
 Xestocephalus ryukyuensis Kamitani 2005 c g
 Xestocephalus shikokuanus Ishihara 1961 c g
 Xestocephalus sidnicus Kirkaldy 1907 c g
 Xestocephalus similis  b
 Xestocephalus sinchonus DeLong 1982 c g
 Xestocephalus spicatus DeLong & Linnavuori 1978 c g
 Xestocephalus spinestyleus Li & Dai 2003 c g
 Xestocephalus spinifer Linnavuori 1979 c g
 Xestocephalus spinosus Linnavuori 1957 c g
 Xestocephalus suakoko Linnavuori 1979 c g
 Xestocephalus subfusculus Melichar 1905 c g
 Xestocephalus subtessellatus Linnavuori 1959 c g
 Xestocephalus superbus (Provancher, 1890) b
 Xestocephalus sycophantus Linnavuori 1979 c g
 Xestocephalus tangaensis Linnavuori 1979 c g
 Xestocephalus tasmaniensis Evans 1938 c g
 Xestocephalus tesselatus  b
 Xestocephalus tessellatus Van Duzee 1894 c g
 Xestocephalus toroensis Matsumura 1914 c g
 Xestocephalus transversus Distant 1918 c g
 Xestocephalus triatus Caldwell 1952 c g
 Xestocephalus tucsoni Knull, 1944 c g b
 Xestocephalus tutuilanus Osborn 1934 c g
 Xestocephalus variarius DeLong 1982 c g
 Xestocephalus vitiensis Kirkaldy 1907 c g
 Xestocephalus vittanotus Cwikla & Wolda 1986 c g
 Xestocephalus youngi Cwikla 1985 c g
 Xestocephalus zambicus Linnavuori 1979 c g

Data sources: i = ITIS, c = Catalogue of Life, g = GBIF, b = Bugguide.net

References

Xestocephalus